The 1875–76 Tufts Jumbos football team represented Tufts University in the 1875 college football season. Tufts' official program record for 1875 is 2-1 due to the school considering a June 4, 1875 victory over Harvard to be part of its 1875 season. The victory over Bates was the first intercollegiate football game in the state of Maine.

Schedule

References

Standings

Tufts
Tufts Jumbos football seasons
College football winless seasons
Tufts Jumbos football